Jason Welborn (born 9 May 1986) is an English professional boxer who challenged once for the unified WBA (Super), IBF and IBO light-middleweight titles in 2018. At regional level, he held the British middleweight title in 2018, and challenged for the British welterweight and light middleweight titles in 2013 and 2014 respectively, and the Commonwealth light-middleweight and middleweight titles in 2019 and 2020 respectively.

Professional career

Welborn vs. Ambler 
Welborn made his professional debut on 12 December 2005, scoring a first-round technical knockout (TKO) victory over Jamie Ambler at the Holiday Inn, Birmingham.

Welborn vs. Booth 
On 27 February 2006, Welborn lost his second professional fight by third-round knockout (KO) to Tyan Booth.

Welborn vs. Gavin 
On 18 January 2013, after going on a ten fight winning streak, he faced undefeated British welterweight champion Frankie Gavin at the Walsall Town Hall in Walsall, losing via seventh-round TKO.

Welborn vs. Smith 
Five fights later, after moving up in weight, he challenged undefeated British light-middleweight champion Liam Smith on 26 July 2014 at the Phones 4u Arena in Manchester. Welborn lost the fight by sixth-round KO.

Welborn vs. Macklin 
On 17 October 2015, Welborn lost a ten-round unanimous decision (UD) for the vacant WBC International light-middleweight title against former British and European middleweight champion Matthew Macklin at the Barclaycard Arena in Birmingham. Two judges scored the bout 96–94 while the third scored it 97–93.

Welbron vs. Morrison 
On 25 March 2017, Welborn beat undefeated prospect Marcus Morrison by UD over ten rounds to capture the WBC International Silver middleweight title at the Manchester Arena, Manchester, with two judges scoring the bout 96–93 and the third scoring it 97–92.

Welborn vs. Langford 
He made a third attempt at a British title on 4 May 2018, against Tommy Langford at the Walsall Town Hall. Welborn won via split decision (SD) over twelve rounds to capture Langford's British middleweight title. Two judges scored the bout 114–113 to Welborn, while the third scored it 115–113 in favour of Langford.

Welborn vs. Langford II 
He defended his British middleweight title on 8 September 2018 in a rematch against Tommy Langford at Arena Birmingham. Welborn retained the title with another split decision victory, with the scorecards reading 115–114, 114–113 and 113–114.

Welborn vs. Hurd 
On 1 December 2018, Welborn, ranked #11 by the WBA at super welterweight, faced undefeated unified light-middleweight champion Jarrett Hurd for the WBA (Super), IBF, and IBO titles at the Staples Center in Los Angeles, California, losing via fourth-round KO. Welborn started the fight as the aggressor, pressuring the champion on the front foot throughout the first round which saw Hurd being defensive, taking clean punches and a solid right hand. The second round saw Hurd pick up the pace, with Welborn still out working the champion. The third round was much of the same, with Welborn backing Hurd up against the ropes. In the fourth, Welborn started fast as he did in the previous rounds, once again backing Hurd up against the ropes. Untroubled by Welborn's power, Hurd took the centre of the ring and began to throw heavy punches, ending with an accurate shot to the body that put Welborn down. He managed to get to his feet at the count of ten but referee Lou Moret waved the fight off.

Welborn vs. Metcalf 
Welborn next challenged James Metcalf on 15 June 2019 for the vacant Commonwealth light-middleweight title at the First Direct Arena in Leeds, losing via eighth-round KO.

Welborn vs. Cash 
In his next bout, Welborn fought Felix Cash for his Commonwealth middleweight title. Cash dropped Welborn twice in the fifth round before Welborn's corner threw decided to throw in the towel.

Professional boxing record

References

External links
 Jason Welborn - Profile, News Archive & Current Rankings at Box.Live

Living people
1986 births
Sportspeople from the West Midlands (county)
English male boxers
Light-middleweight boxers
British Boxing Board of Control champions